Reading 1251 is a preserved class "B-4a" 0-6-0 tank locomotive built by the Reading Company's own locomotive shops in Reading in 1918 as the only tank locomotive to be rostered by the Reading after World War I. It served as a shop switcher to pull and push locomotives in and out of the Reading's shops, until it was taken off of the Reading's active list in early 1963. It subsequently spent the next eight years being sold to various owners until becoming fully owned by the Railroad Museum of Pennsylvania in Strasburg for static display. As of 2023, the locomotive remains on indoor display inside the museum and isn't likely to run again anytime soon.

History

Original service life 
During World War I, the Reading Company constructed various designs of switcher locomotives from their own shops in Reading, Pennsylvania to serve their various yards and roundhouses across their system. In September 1918, a unique saddle tank locomotive rolled out of the Reading shops after being constructed from parts of an I-2a class 2-8-0. That locomotive was B-4a No. 1251, which ended up being the only tank locomotive to be rostered by the Reading after the end of the War. The locomotive was never meant to be used as a road locomotive, rather a shop switcher, or 'goat' as they were often nicknamed, to tow locomotives in and out of the Reading's locomotive facility.

Multiple brand new locomotives were still rolling out of the facility, and others were continuously in need of repairs, so No. 1251 was kept busy shoving locomotives in and out. It was still maintained and cleaned well to stay operable, and since it was easy to operate and maintain, it was well liked by crews. As the 1950s progressed, even the Reading was in the process of dieselizing their locomotive fleet, and although No. 1251 remained on the active list the longest, the only thing forcing it into retirement was age. Its last revenue switching assignment occurred on February 8, 1963.

Preservation 
George M. Hart was a steam locomotive historian who formerly worked with Reading Company for years. As the famed Iron Horse Rambles excursions were coming to an end, Hart decided to operate his own steam excursions in various parts of the Northeastern United States, and he founded his own private company Rail Tours Incorporated. In early 1964, Hart purchased No. 1251 from the Reading, and after some repair work was completed, No. 1251 was put into excursion service over the Maryland and Pennsylvania Railroad in York County. Owing to its low fuel capacity, No. 1251 was also fitted with an Ex-Reading tender to decrease the amount of stops it would require.

In October 1966, No. 1251 was formerly retired from excursion service after its flue time expired, and it was subsequently replaced by larger locomotives from the Canadian Pacific Railway, including 4-6-0 No. 972. Two years later, No. 1251 was sold to the Pennsylvania Historical and Museum Commission with the hopes of putting it on static display at Hart's future museum ground at Strasburg. No. 1251 was moved across the Strasburg Rail Road and was put in the yard of the new Railroad Museum of Pennsylvania for storage. As construction of the museum's building was almost completed in 1972, the No. 1251 was outright donated to the museum as a permanent addition to their locomotive collection.

In 1982, museum volunteers worked to cosmetically restore No. 1251 to make it look nicer for public view, and when it was completed, No. 1251 was moved inside the museum's main building, surrounded by a few Pennsylvania Railroad locomotives. As of 2023, the locomotive remains inside the museum, safely out of the elements and vandals. Despite being indoors, there are no plans of restoring No. 1251 back to operating condition anytime soon.

Historical significance 
No. 1251 is a one of a kind locomotive design, as no identical copies of the B-4as were ever made. It is also the only one out of over 830 steam locomotives ever built brand new by the Reading's own locomotive shops to ever escape the scrapper's torch.

The locomotive also holds the distinction of being the last standard gauge steam locomotive to ever daily operate for a class 1 railroad in the United States.

See also 
 Reading 2102
 Reading 2124
 Canadian National 7312
 Pennsylvania Railroad 1223

References

External links 
Railroad Museum of Pennsylvania official website

Individual locomotives of the United States
0-6-0 locomotives
Baldwin locomotives
Philadelphia and Reading Railroad locomotives
Shunting locomotives
1251
Standard gauge locomotives of the United States
Preserved steam locomotives of Pennsylvania
Tank locomotives
Saddle tank locomotives
Railway locomotives introduced in 1918